An acquired taste is an appreciation for something unlikely to be enjoyed by a person who has not had substantial exposure to it. It is the opposite of innate taste, which is the appreciation for things that are enjoyable by most persons without prior exposure to them.

Characteristics 
In case of food and drink, the difficulty of enjoying the product may be due to a strong odor (such as certain types of cheese, durian, hákarl, black salt, nattō, asafoetida, surströmming, or stinky tofu), taste (as in alcoholic beverages, coffee, Vegemite or Marmite, bitter teas, liquorice/salty liquorice, South Asian pickles, malt bread, unsweetened chocolate, garnatálg, rakfisk, soused herring, haggis), mouthfeel (such as sashimi and sushi featuring uncooked seafood), appearance, or association (such as eating insects or organ meat).

Acquisition

General
The process of acquiring a taste can involve developmental maturation, genetics (of both taste sensitivity and personality), family example, and biochemical reward properties of foods.  Infants are born preferring sweet foods and rejecting sour and bitter tastes, and they develop a preference for salt at approximately 4 months. However, vegetables tend to be a favourite as they start to learn to feed themselves. Neophobia (fear of novelty) tends to vary with age in predictable, but not linear, ways.  Babies just beginning to eat solid foods generally accept a wide variety of foods, toddlers and young children are relatively neophobic towards food, and older children, adults, and the elderly are often adventurous eaters with wide-ranging tastes.

The general personality trait of novelty-seeking does not necessarily correlate highly with willingness to try new foods.  Level of food adventurousness may explain much of the variability of food preferences observed in "supertasters".  Supertasters are highly sensitive to bitter, spicy, and pungent flavours, and some avoid them and like to eat only mild, plain foods, but many supertasters who have high food adventurousness enjoy these intense flavors and seek them out.  Some chemicals or combinations of chemicals in foods provide both flavor and beneficial or enjoyable effects on the body and mind and may be reinforcing, leading to an acquired taste.  A study that investigated the effect of adding caffeine and theobromine (active compounds in chocolate) vs. a placebo to identically flavored drinks that participants tasted several times, yielded the development of a strong preference for the drink with the compounds.

Intentional
Intentionally changing one's preferences can be hard to accomplish. It usually requires a deliberate effort, acting as if one likes something in order to have the responses and feelings that will produce the desired taste. The challenge becomes one of distinguishing authentic or legitimate acquired tastes as a result of deeply considered preference changes from inauthentic ones motivated by status or conformity.

Examples 
The following items can be described as "acquired tastes", often due to combination of both unfamiliarity and intensity of taste.  In principle, though, anything for which one can have a taste, can also become an acquired taste. An acquired taste is distinguished by how one comes to have the taste, not what the thing in question is.
 Absinthe, a strong herbal spirit, often with pronounced anise and bitter (wormwood) flavors
 Achar, South Asian pickles
 Aloe vera, a type of plant whose inner pulp is sometimes used in drinks, very common in Japan
 Anchovies, small fish cured in brine, known for their intensely strong salty flavor, often used as a pizza topping
 Andouillette, a French tripe sausage
 Artichoke
 Balut, a boiled, fertilized duck egg
 Beondegi, steamed or boiled silkworm pupa, popular in Korean cuisine
 Beer, especially strong ales and stouts
 Bitters, an alcohol flavoured with bitter plant extracts, used as an additive in cocktails or as a medicinal substance to promote appetite or digestion.
 Bitter melon, an extremely bitter fruit similar to cucumber
 Blood sausage, sausage made by cooking animal blood with a filler until it is thick enough to congeal when cooled
 Brussels sprout
 Bosintang, a Korean meal with dog meat
 Boza, a fermented corn drink of Turkish origin, also popular on the Balkans
 Calamari (squid)
 Camel paw, a Chinese delicacy served in the Forbidden City
 Campari, a bitter Italian aperitif
 Capers, pickled and salted buds or fruits of the caper shrub.
 Casu martzu, a Sardinian cheese containing live insect larvae
 Cauliflower
 Caviar, a prized delicacy consisting of salted roe (fish eggs) from sturgeon
 Century egg, a specially preserved Chinese egg
 Chamoy, heavily salted Mexican plum or apricot paste with chili powder
 Strongly-flavored cheeses, such as blue cheese, Gamalost, goat cheese, or Limburger
 Chili pepper, the common source of "hot" spices.
 Chitterlings (commonly referred to as "chitlins"), boiled or stewed pig intestines
 Cilantro (also known as coriander); some people perceive an unpleasant "soapy" taste and/or a rank smell. This is believed to be a result of an enzyme that changes its taste (a genetic trait).
 Clamato, a drink made primarily of reconstituted tomato juice concentrate and reconstituted dried clam broth, with a dash of high-fructose corn syrup, and USDA Red 40 to maintain a 'natural' tomato colour
 Coffee, a bitter beverage prepared from roasted coffee seeds
 Cow cod soup, a Jamaican soup made with bull penis (or "cod")
 Cow tongue
 Cup cheese, a Pennsylvania Dutch runny cheese, sharp or mild
 Dark chocolate, processed chocolate that has little or no added sugar or milk, and therefore has a bitter taste.
 Dijon mustard
 Durian, a pungent southeast Asian fruit
 Eel, seafood, an Anguilliform
 Eulachon grease, extracted from eulachon fish
 Feet, of cow, calf, pig, duck, chicken, camel, goat, etc.
 Fernet, a particularly strong, grape based, herbal digestif
 Fish sauce, a condiment derived from fish that have been allowed to ferment
 Gravlax, raw-marinated salmon
 Garlic
 Gull eggs, eaten boiled and popular in Scandinavia and some parts of Scotland and Ireland
 Haggis, a traditional Scottish dish mainly consisting of minced sheep offal, boiled in a sheep's stomach.
 Hajmola, a digestive candy made in India.
 Hákarl, putrefied Iceland shark
 Head cheese, a dish made of meat from an animal's skull covered with gelatin (usually set in a mold)
 Huitlacoche, fungus-infected maize, popular in Mexico
 Insects, including grubs, ants, grasshoppers, locusts, etc.
 Islay whisky, Scotch whisky made on Islay, known for its distinctive peaty character
 Jägermeister, a strong German herbal digestif
 Jiló, bitter fruit (cooked as a vegetable) popular in Brazil
 Kimchi, traditional Korean dish of fermented chili peppers and vegetables, usually made from Chinese cabbage
 Kola nut, an extremely bitter nut used in West Africa
 Kutti pi, an Anglo-Indian dish consisting of goat fetus
 Liver and/or liverwurst
 Lapsang souchong, smoked Chinese black tea
 Lobster tomalley, the soft, green substance found in the body cavity of lobsters, that fulfills the functions of both the liver and the pancreas.
 Lutefisk, Nordic lye-soaked whitefish
 Marmite, Vegemite or Cenovis, spreads made from yeast extract
 Mate, the infusion of yerba mate
 Matcha, finely ground powder of specially grown and processed green tea leaves
 Moxie, a bitter carbonated beverage containing gentian root extract
 Mugicha, or barley tea, which is a popular Japanese beverage
 Edible mushrooms, mushrooms that can potentially be safely eaten.
 Nattō, Japanese fermented soybeans
 Octopus, seafood, a cephalopod
 Olives, fermented or cured fruit of the olive tree, come in different varieties and have a salty, bitter, oily taste.
 Organ meats, whether tripe, brains, eyeballs, giblets, liver, sweetbreads, etc.
 Peanut butter
 Pickled eggs
 Pickled pigs' feet
 Piure a tunicate with a strong taste to iodine eating in Chile.
 Pork rind, the cooked skin of a pork
 Pu-erh, a compressed, aged tea dominated by strong, earthy overtones
 Rakfisk, a Norwegian fermented fish dish often served with lefse and flatbrød.
 Rivella, a Swiss carbonated soft drink made from whey.
 Root beer, an herbal-flavored soft drink
 Rocky Mountain oysters, testicles of bull or boar
 Prairie oysters, testicles of a bull, calf, or deer. Term originates from Canadian Prairies.
 Salmiak Drop, Finnish/Dutch ammonium salt liquorice candy
 Sea cucumber
 Sea urchin
 Scotch whisky, a woody-tasting alcoholic substance.
 Scrapple, a slab of leftover pork parts.
 Smalahove, the head of a lamb
 Stink bean, beans bearing a rather peculiar smell, quite popular in southeast Asia
 Stinky tofu, a form of fermented tofu, which, as the name suggests, has a strong odor.
 Sun-dried tomatoes
 Surströmming, Swedish fermented Baltic herring
 Sushi, a Japanese food sometimes made with raw fish and sashimi
 Switchel, an Anglo-Caribbean summer drink based on vinegar and molasses, also called Haymaker's Punch
 Tempeh, a fermented food made from soybeans popular in Southeast Asia
 Tonic water, carbonated water flavored with quinine, giving the beverage its bitter taste.
 Tobacco
 Unicum, a Hungarian herbal bitter
 Wasabi, and similarly horseradish, due to their pungent odors and strong taste
 Wine and fortified wine

See also 
 Aftertaste
 Food choice
 Food preferences in older adults and seniors
 Habituation
 Taste

References

Further reading
 

Gustation
Aesthetics